The Labour Day Classic (branded as OK Tire Labour Day Weekend for sponsorship reasons) is a week of the Canadian Football League (CFL) schedule played over the Labour Day weekend (which includes the first Monday in September). Labour Day weekend, roughly 12 or 13 weeks into the CFL season, is known for its matchups that do not change from year to year, unlike other "rivalry" weeks of the CFL schedule. Labour Day weekend is also one of typically two weeks (the Thanksgiving Day Classic being the other) in the CFL schedule that the league plays on a Monday. Multinational Balkrishna Industries' OK Tire brand is the presenting sponsor of the event as of 2022.

The current weekend matchups involve the Montreal Alouettes playing against the Ottawa Redblacks on the Friday before Labour Day, with host duties alternating between the two teams. The Winnipeg Blue Bombers then visit the Saskatchewan Roughriders on Sunday and on Labour Day itself, the Hamilton Tiger-Cats play at home against the Toronto Argonauts, while the Edmonton Elks visit the Calgary Stampeders. The BC Lions have no geographic rival and typically have a bye, having last played on Labour Day Weekend in 2015.

History

The Labour Day Classic began in 1949 and pre-dates the founding of the CFL by nine years. The matchups have remained mostly the same throughout history, except during Montreal and Ottawa's periods of hiatus or due to scheduling conflicts.

During the early 1980s, the Montreal Concordes played the Hamilton Tiger-Cats and the remaining three teams (Toronto, Ottawa and BC) rotated each year. Ottawa and BC faced each other during the late 1980s and early 1990s while the league had no team in Montreal.

Because Ottawa had no active team from 1997–2001 and 2006–2013, the Alouettes usually played the Lions during those seasons, creating a "coast-to-coast" rivalry.

Due to the COVID-19 pandemic in Canada, the entire 2020 CFL season was cancelled and therefore no Labour Day weekend games were played for the first time in CFL history.

Hamilton 
Due to scheduling conflicts, the Tiger-Cats temporarily revived its rivalry with the current incarnation of the Alouettes in the Labour Day game for the 2011 season; the change in opponents led Hamilton to dub the game the Labour Day Classique in reference to Montreal's francophone community. Therefore in 2011, this automatically resulted in Toronto and BC facing each other.

In 2013, the Tiger-Cats' did not host a game on Labour Day for only the second time in franchise history (the first being 1995). It was also the first time that they did not host a game on that weekend. Because Ivor Wynne Stadium was demolished to make way for the new Tim Hortons Field, the team played out of Alumni Stadium in Guelph. The University of Guelph Gryphons (along with most Ontario University Athletics teams) were playing that same day, so the Tiger-Cats could not host the game. To make up for it, the Toronto at Hamilton matchup was played in the Thanksgiving Day Classic.

For the 2016 contest, to avoid any further conflicts with OUA games, the CFL moved the Toronto/Hamilton matchup to prime time Labour Day evening. That year, the OUA's McMaster Marauders football team moved its Labour Day matchup with the Toronto Varsity Blues football squad to Tim Hortons Field, creating a doubleheader with a series of concerts in-between games. This was moved back to a 1:00 pm Eastern start in 2019.

Related events 
Although not directly associated with the Labour Day Classic, the week after Labour Day often has a repeat match-up of the Bombers vs Roughriders (see Banjo Bowl), Stampeders vs Elks (see Battle of Alberta), and Tiger-Cats vs Argonauts (a rivalry which began in 1873), with home field advantage now to the team that did not have it during the Labour Day weekend.

As the league has been increasing in popularity in recent years, print ads for the Labour Day Classic try to evoke the tradition of watching Canadian football on the last weekend of summer. Slogans include "Long Live the Rivalries" and "Watch the Team You Love Play the Team You Love to Hate". Some of the teams wear special third jerseys or throwback uniforms if they play at home.

Current matchups

Edmonton vs Calgary

Longest Winning Streak (Edmonton): 7 (1950–1961)
Longest Winning Streak (Stampeders): 8 (2012–2019)

Did not play in the following years: 1954–1958, 1964–1968, 1973, 1981, 2020

Winnipeg vs Saskatchewan
In the week following the Winnipeg vs Saskatchewan Labour Day Classic matchup, the two teams rematch annually in the Banjo Bowl.

Longest winning streak (Roughriders): 11 (2005–2015)
Longest winning streak (Blue Bombers): 4 (1978–1982)

Did not play the following years: 1955–1960, 1964–1969, 1971, 1973, 1976, 1981, 2020

Toronto vs Hamilton
The Toronto—Hamilton Classic is one of the components of the Harold Ballard Trophy, an award given to the winner of the season series between the Tiger-Cats and Argonauts. The trophy is named after Harold Ballard, who owned the Tiger-Cats for much of the 1980s and owned Maple Leaf Sports & Entertainment for most of that time. A trophy has been awarded to the winner of the series since 1979.

The Toronto—Hamilton contest is officially known as Football Day in Hamilton and has its own presenting sponsor, WeatherTech Canada. Since the opening of Tim Hortons Field, Football Day in Hamilton has consisted of a Tiger-Cats game as well as a concert and either a McMaster Marauders football or a Hamilton Hurricanes (CJFL) matinée.

Longest Winning Streak (Tiger-Cats): 7 (2014–2021)
Longest Winning Streak (Argonauts): 3 (1994–1997, 2006–2008)

Did not play the following years: 1962, 1965–1966, 1969–1970, 1972–1974, 1976–1977, 1979, 1981–1986, 1990, 1995, 2011, 2013, 2020

Ottawa vs Montreal

Longest Winning Streak (Ottawa): 7 (1961–2003)
Longest Winning Streak (Montreal): 6 (1954–1959)

Did not play in following years: 1950–1952, 1962, 1964–1966, 1968–1970, 1972–1977, 1979–1986, 2002, 2015, 2019, 2020, 2023
Notes
No Montreal team 1987–1995
No Ottawa team 1997–2001, 2006–2013

Other matchups

BC vs Montreal

BC vs Ottawa

Montreal vs Hamilton
Hamilton has played and hosted the Labour Day Classic against Montreal (aka Labour Day Classique) nine times in CFL history. According to a Hamilton Spectator article, 2011 marked 25 years since Montreal had battled Hamilton in this Classic at home. In previous years, Montreal has played as either the Alouettes or Concordes. The Classique has been a notoriously one-sided rivalry; Hamilton is undefeated in the Labour Day series, and Montreal is winless, with their best result being a tie in the first Classique in 1962.

References

Canadian Football League
Canadian football in Alberta
Canadian football in Ontario
Canadian football in Saskatchewan
Recurring sporting events established in 1949
September events
Sport in Calgary
Canadian football in Hamilton, Ontario
Sport in Regina, Saskatchewan
Sports rivalries in Canada
1949 establishments in Canada